Johanns Alexander Dulcien Neira (born 26 March 1991) is a Chilean former footballer who played as an attacking midfielder.

Personal life
He got a degree in business administration at the DUOC UC and manages a company focused in home cleaning in Antofagasta, Chile.

References

External links
 
 
 Johanns Dulcien at PlaymakerStats

1991 births
Living people
People from Tocopilla
Chilean people of French descent
Chilean footballers
Association football midfielders
Colo-Colo footballers
Unión San Felipe footballers
Naval de Talcahuano footballers
Deportes Melipilla footballers
San Antonio Unido footballers
Sahab SC players
Municipal La Pintana footballers
Chilean Primera División players
Primera B de Chile players
Segunda División Profesional de Chile players
Jordanian Pro League players
Chilean expatriate sportspeople in Jordan
Expatriate footballers in Jordan